Burgruine Mödling is castle ruin   in Lower Austria.

See also
List of castles in Austria

References

This article was initially translated from the German Wikipedia.

Castles in Lower Austria
Ruined castles in Austria